"I'm Coming Home" is a popular song written by British musicians John Barry Mason and Les Reed. Released in 1967 as a single by Welsh musician Tom Jones, the song was an international hit, reaching the top position on the Belgium record charts, number two in the United Kingdom, sixth place on the Dutch charts, and peaking at number 10 in Ireland.

Charts

References

1967 songs
1967 singles
Tom Jones (singer) songs